Oybek Kilichev (born 17 January 1989) is an Uzbek footballer playing for FC Qizilqum Zarafshon as a midfielder.

Club career
Born in Tashkent, he started his youth career with Traktor Tashkent in 2007 before joining FK Pakhtakor in 2008. In 2010, after being promoted to the first team, he made 2 appearances for the club. In order to get more first team appearances he tried his luck with FK Andijan. The following year saw him returning to his former club. In January 2014, he signed for Al-Shaab of UAE Pro League.

On 20 January 2015, Kilichev moved to Persian Gulf Pro League side Paykan F.C. on a free transfer, signing an 18-month contract. Kilichev signed with his current club, FK Pakhtakor on 15 January 2016. He signed with Perak FA in June 2016.

Honours
FK Pakhtakor
Uzbek League (1): 2012

References

External links

1989 births
Living people
Uzbekistani footballers
Uzbekistani expatriate footballers
Association football midfielders
Al-Shaab CSC players
Perak F.C. players
Pakhtakor Tashkent FK players
Traktor Tashkent players
FK Andijon players
Navbahor Namangan players
FC AGMK players
PFC Lokomotiv Tashkent players
FC Qizilqum Zarafshon players
Uzbekistan Super League players
Malaysia Super League players
Persian Gulf Pro League players
UAE Pro League players
Expatriate footballers in the United Arab Emirates
Expatriate footballers in Iran
Expatriate footballers in Malaysia
Uzbekistani expatriate sportspeople in the United Arab Emirates
Uzbekistani expatriate sportspeople in Iran
Uzbekistani expatriate sportspeople in Malaysia
Uzbekistan international footballers